Shaun Shankel is an American Grammy nominated, Dove Award winning songwriter and record producer, who has written and produced for some of the biggest selling artists in the pop and Christian and Country music markets, selling over seven million albums and singles. He has had 12 No. 1 hits and song placements in over 18 film, television and commercial campaigns.

Early life
Shankel grew up playing music in his family and with his grandfather on harmonica (he made several albums singing in a quartet with the Gospel Harolds), his father on guitar and Shaun on piano, they would sing and harmonize old hymns. He started studying piano professionally at 7 and by 10 was writing and performing his own songs in school. In high school he wrote for the glee club and played in several Indianapolis area rock bands.  Shaun went to Indiana University, where he graduated with a double degree in Audio Technology and Music and Telecommunications.  Also while at school, he wrote music for television shows on the PBS affiliate, WTUI.

Music career
After college, Shankel moved to Nashville, Tennessee, to work for writer/producer Keith Thomas, in various capacities. He assisted him in all aspects including engineering, writing and production management. During that time he also worked with Vanessa Williams, Amy Grant, Mandy Moore, 98 Degrees, and Michael Bolton.

After five years, Shankel decided to leave and pursue his own production career, and set up shop at Lealand Studios.

During the next few years, Shankel became one of the most sought after producer/writers. Some of the artists he has worked with include Kimberley Locke, Hilary Duff, Clay Aiken, Nicholas Jonas (and the Jonas Brothers)  Jadyn Maria (Herbal Essences national campaign), RJ Helton, Natalie Grant, Mandisa, Chronicles of Narnia, Rebecca St. James, Jump 5, Tyler Hilton,  Mark Schultz, Plumb, Avalon, ZOEGirl, Michael English and  For King & Country.

During this time he also spotted a talent in songwriter in Kyle Jacobs and signed him to a joint venture, Fortune Favors the Bold Music Publishing, with Curb Music Publishing. Jacobs has recorded with Tim McGraw, Kellie Pickler and Garth Brooks, whose Jacobs penned hit single, "More Than a Memory", is the only song in history to debut at #1 on the country charts.

In 2005, Shankel signed with Warner Chappell Music and while pursuing his own projects created another joint venture, Shankel Songs and signed Ben Glover, Billboard's Christian writer of the Year, 2010, Joy Williams of The Civil Wars, and For King & Country: The EP, whom he also produced.

Discography

References

Year of birth missing (living people)
Living people
People from Nashville, Tennessee
Songwriters from Tennessee
Record producers from Tennessee
Indiana University alumni
Place of birth missing (living people)